Chapil is a traditional Colombian alcoholic beverage that originated in the area of Nariño. It is also produced in provinces adjacent to the Carchi border area between Colombia and Ecuador. The Awa people think that  protects people from evil spirits.

References

Ecuadorian cuisine
Colombian cuisine
Alcoholic drinks